The Mandel No. 1 Photo Postcard Machine was a photo camera built in the years 1911 to 1930 by the Chicago Ferrotype Company. Like cameras from some other brands in that time, the camera produced a small photograph in waiting time. The photograph could be used as a real photo postcard and sent by mail, hence the name.

The machine was sold to amateurs and professionals alike. For a professional it was possible, after some learning, to provide customers in the street with a picture of themselves in a couple of minutes. The photo card was developed right in the machine.

References

External links
Scott's Photographica Collection Chicago Ferrotype Company Mandelette Postcard Camera 
Photography companies of the United States
History of photography
Postcards